Sint-Niklaas is a railway station in Sint-Niklaas, East Flanders, Belgium.  The station opened on 3 November 1844 on the Line 59. The train services are operated by NMBS/SNCB.

The current building was built in 1972 by architects Ludwig Van Wilder and Omer De Grootte.

Train services
The following services currently serve the station:

Intercity services (IC-02) Ostend - Bruges - Ghent - Sint-Niklaas - Antwerpen
Intercity services (IC-04) Lille/Poperinge - Kortrijk - Ghent - Sint-Niklaas - Antwerp
Intercity services (IC-26) Kortrijk - Tournai - Halle - Brussels - Dendermonde - Lokeren - Sint Niklaas (weekdays)
Intercity services (IC-28) Ghent - Sint-Niklaas - Antwerp (weekdays)
Local services (L-20) Sint-Niklaas – Mechelen – Leuven (weekdays)
Local services (L-27) Sint-Niklaas - Mechelen (weekends)
Local services (L-30) Lokeren - Sint-Niklaas - Antwerp

References

External links
Belgian Railways website for Sint-Niklaas

Railway stations in Belgium
Railway stations opened in 1844
Railway stations in East Flanders
Railway stations in Belgium opened in 1844